Batelapine (developmental code name CGS-13429) is a structural analogue of clozapine which was investigated as a potential antipsychotic.

References

External links
 Batelapine - AdisInsight

Abandoned drugs
Antipsychotics
Benzodiazepines
Piperazines
Tricyclic compounds